Night-Slayer is a fictional character in the DC Comics universe. He first appeared in Detective Comics #529 (August 1983), and was created by Doug Moench and Gene Colan.

Fictional character biography
The son of a Gotham City millionaire (and undercover crime lord), Anton Knight was raised in a life of luxury and privilege. Even so, as a youth he yearned to improve himself, honing his body and mind to a sharp edge. He studied the martial arts and eventually left for the East to learn from the Masters.

Anton learned of his father's death while travelling in the Orient studying the martial arts. At the funeral, Anton met his stepsister Natalia (also, perhaps erroneously, called Natasha) whom he had never met before and who had been raised in poverty. The long-separated stepsiblings fell in love and began a partnership. Natalia quickly became accustomed to the life of luxury Anton had always known, but the couple soon used up their inheritance, in no small part because Natalia needed expensive medical help due to a rare "light sensitivity" skin pigmentation disorder.

Natalia and Anton adopted a nocturnal existence to protect Natalia from the damaging rays of the sun, while continuing to use the expensive medical equipment to treat her skin sensitivity. After the inheritance money began to run short, Anton and Natalia decided to keep themselves in their accustomed lavish lifestyle through burglary, following in their father's criminal footsteps. Clad in a black body suit, Anton used his martial arts and acrobatic prowess to rob Gotham City's rich as the "Thief of Night", while Natalia operated behind the scenes as "Nocturna, Mistress of the Night".

Anton, having spent much time in Asia, proved to be a highly capable martial artist. However their burglary soon brought them into conflict with Batman. The two had several clashes with the Darknight Detective, many of which ended with no clear-cut victor. For a while, the Night-Slayer even traded identities with a delirious Batman.

After several clashes with Batman, Anton was eventually captured and sent to prison. Nocturna remained free and continued her life of crime along with a new ally, Nightshade. Anton finally escaped and, after being rejected by his beloved Nocturna, changed his style and became the murderous "Night-Slayer". He killed Nightshade, an action which the more moral Nocturna abhorred (which is why she rejected him), accusing Anton of slaying the night. After being betrayed too many times by Nocturna, Anton vowed to kill her. However, that never occurred as he was again put in jail by the Catwoman, while Nocturna seemingly died in an accident.

When last seen, Night-Slayer was freed from prison in a mass breakout engineered by Ra's al Ghul.

Post-Crisis absence
While his stepsister and former partner Nocturna has returned to make various minor comics appearances over the years, Night-Slayer has been notably absent. Because of this, it remains unclear if Night-Slayer's existence is canonical in the Post-Crisis universe.

Powers and abilities
Night-Slayer is an expert martial artist.

In other media
 Night-Slayer appears as an enemy in the NES Batman videogame.

See also
List of Batman family enemies

References

External links
DCU Guide: Nightslayer

DC Comics male supervillains
DC Comics martial artists
DC Comics supervillains
Fictional professional thieves
Comics characters introduced in 1983
Characters created by Doug Moench
Characters created by Gene Colan